Nicola Jackson may refer to:

 Nicola Jackson (artist) (born 1960), New Zealand artist
 Nicola Jackson (born 1984), British former competitive swimmer